is a Japanese women's professional shogi player ranked 1-dan.

Promotion history
Fujii's promotion history is as follows:

 3-kyū: February 20, 2017
 2-kyū: June 6, 2018
 1-kyū: December 27, 2018
 1-dan: April 1, 2020

Note: All ranks are women's professional ranks.

References

External links
 ShogiHub: Fujii, Nana

Japanese shogi players
Living people
Women's professional shogi players
Professional shogi players from Kyoto Prefecture
1998 births
People from Kyoto Prefecture